A drum pedal is a foot-controlled pedal used to play a drum. The most common types are:

 Bass drum pedal
 Hi-hat (cymbals) pedal
 Tambourine pedal
 Timpani pedal

Pedal
Musical instrument parts and accessories